Litr (also Lit; Old Norse: , 'colour, appearance') is the name borne by a dwarf and a jötunn in Norse mythology.

Name 
The Old Norse name Litr has been translated as 'colour', 'hue', or 'appearance'. It stems from a Proto-Germanic form reconstructed as *ulituz (compare with Gothic wlits 'shape, appearance', or Old English wlite 'clearness, sparkle').

Dwarf

In Snorri Sturluson's Gylfaginning (49), Litr is kicked into Baldr's funeral pyre by Thor:
Then Thor stood by and hallowed the pyre with Mjöllnir; and before his feet ran a certain dwarf which was named Litr; Thor kicked at him with his foot and thrust him into the fire, and he burned.

—Gylfaginning, Brodeur's translation

Litr is also listed as a dwarf in Völuspá (12).

A dwarf named Litr also appears in Áns saga bogsveigis, where he is coerced by the protagonist Án to build him a bow.

Jötunn
In a stanza by Bragi Boddason quoted in Snorri's Skáldskaparmál (42) Litr is also mentioned in a kenning for Thor: "Lit's men's fight-challenger" ("Litar flotna fangboði").

References

Bibliography

Articles about multiple fictional characters
Norse dwarves
Jötnar
Thor